Rocco Barocco (born 26 March 1944 in Naples, Italy) is a fashion designer.

His real name is Antonio Muscariello. After his first steps in the fashion industry he legally changed his name to Rocco Barocco.

During his childhood and youth, he lived on the island of Ischia in front of Naples, where he grew up with his eight brothers. Charmed by the fashion world, he decided to move to Rome in 1962, where he worked with Patrick de Barentzen and Giles. In 1964 he started a company with Giles, which lasted for over ten years.

In 1974 he opened his own show room in Rome's piazza di Spagna and in 1979, after his success in haute couture, he presented his first prêt-à-porter collection.

External links 
Official site

References

Living people
Italian fashion designers
Businesspeople from Naples
Watch manufacturing companies of Italy
1944 births